Ommundsen Island is an island just west of Midgley Island in the Windmill Islands. First mapped from air photos taken by U.S. Navy Operation Highjump, 1946–47. Named by Advisory Committee on Antarctic Names (US-ACAN) for Audon Ommundsen, transport specialist at Wilkes Station in 1958.

See also 
 List of antarctic and sub-antarctic islands

Windmill Islands